Avi Sagild (22 February 1933 – 19 September 1995) was a Danish film actress. She appeared in 21 films between 1958 and 1993. She was born in Pittsburgh, Pennsylvania, United States and died in Denmark.

Selected filmography 
 The Greeneyed Elephant (1960)
 Venus fra Vestø (1962)
 Don Olsen kommer til byen (1964)

References

External links 
 

1933 births
1995 deaths
Danish film actresses
20th-century Danish actresses